Cookridge is a suburb of north-west Leeds, West Yorkshire, England, north of the Leeds Outer Ring Road. In 1715 Ralph Thoresby described it as a village four miles from Leeds and three from Otley, dating from 1540.

A mixture of suburban and council owned properties on the border with Holt Park and Tinshill, the area sits in both the Adel & Wharfedale ward of Leeds City Council and the Leeds North West parliamentary constituency. Before 2004, the area sat within Cookridge ward, named after the area.

Nearby places include Adel, Holt Park, Tinshill, Horsforth, Bramhope, Moor Grange and Ireland Wood.

Cookridge holds an annual scarecrow festival hosted by the Leeds Modernians.

Geography 
Cookridge is located in the foothills of the eastern Pennines. Because of its higher elevation it experiences a cooler, windier and wetter climate compared to many other parts of Leeds, and is very exposed to easterly winds. The Beast from the East in February/March 2018 brought heavy snowfall and severe drifting to the area.

Etymology
The name of Cookridge is first attested in the Domesday Book of 1086, as Cucheric. The second element of the name is agreed to come from an Old English word *ric ('narrow strip of land'), attested only in place-names. The origin of the first element is less certain: it could perhaps be from an otherwise unattested personal name, inferred to have been *Cuca, or from a variant of the attested word cwica ('quickset hedge, hedge grown from (hawthorn) cuttings'). Thus the name might once have meant 'Cuca's narrow strip of land' and 'narrow strip of land demarcated by a quickset hedge').

History and buildings
The area had the natural geographic boundaries of the Moseley Beck on the West and South, the Marsh Beck to the North, and the old trackway to the East, running roughly North-South along the line of Spen Lane.  A Roman road passing East-West was excavated in 1966 going through Golden Acre Park, south of Marsh Beck.  The area later became part of the Kingdom of Elmet, being conquered by the Angles in the 7th century, leading to the Old English name that survives to the present.  It was the Danes in the 9th century who named the nearby hill "Tyndr's Hill", now Tinshill.

In the Domesday Book it was listed as the manor of Cucheric, with farmland enough for two ploughs and woodland of 9 square furlongs (36 hectares). In the 12th century, the lands were granted to the monks of Kirkstall Abbey, and in the 13th century the manor became a "vill" or township, part of Cugerig and Adel. The monastery lands were confiscated by Henry VIII and sold off from 1540; this included Cookridge Grange, the site of the present Cookridge Hall.

Cookridge Hall
Early buildings on the Cookridge Hall estate were of wood, thatch, wattle etc., but in the 17th century substantial stone buildings, several which are still in existence, began to be constructed including Cookridge Hall itself. In the early 20th century James Arthur Paul - later of Bramhope Hall - was living with his father, William Paul at Cookridge Hall. James' daughter, Muriel Winifred Middleton née Paul (1904-1979),  had married Major Arthur Daryl Middleton in 1933.  A large pond named Paul's Pond  remains on the Cookridge Estate, having been named after  the grandfather of Muriel Winifred Middleton, William Paul, who had purchased the  hall and  some of the estate land  in 1890. 

The builders of Cookridge Hall  used "rough rock" or boulders which still are still found in the landscape or quarried in fields known as "quarrels". In the 18th century, Cookridge Hall was substantially remodelled, and many other buildings were improved, with stone replacing thatch. At this time the road through Cookridge became busier with coaches from 1754 and earned money as a turnpike. Milestones and mounting stones from the period still survive. There were also more mills along Moseley Beck, notably the Silk Mill (demolished 1978) which gave its name to modern housing estate. It was a home for people with epilepsy from 1955 to 1990 and in 1997 was opened by the Lord Mayor of Leeds as a leisure club with a golf course.

In the 19th century a new road was constructed (now the A660 Otley Road), and the Bramhope Tunnel dug by Moseley farm for a rail line going north from Leeds to Harrogate. A large house called Cookridge Lodge and a tower added. It was demolished in 1970 to make way for an estate, but the gatepost and some outbuildings survive. The Cookridge Estate was bought by Richard Wormald in 1820 and land  was sold in portions by his descendant Francis Wormald in the 1920s. In 1926 Cookridge became part of Leeds and the building of Cookridge village began in 1927 with a triangle of houses between Cookridge Lane, Moseley Wood Lane and Green Lane. This was largely under the direction of architect Cecil Crowther and his builder brothers, taking advantage of subsidies from the Housing Acts of 1923-1925. Mavis Lane and Mavis Avenue are named after Cecil Crowther's daughter.  Crowther acted as estate agent and produced a 1930 brochure entitled Cookridge - Village of Youth extolling its virtues for newly-weds. This included a map showing 135 plots of an area largely bounded by Cookridge Lane to the east, Moseley Wood Lane to the south, and Cookridge Avenue to the north-west. There were six firms of builders, with different styles. Sporadic building continued, but it was after the Second World War that the majority of the estates were constructed, starting with 1948 Iveson and Ireland Wood; 1952 Tinshill, Silkmill and Woodnook; 1957 Moseley Wood; 1973 Holt Park; 1980 Spring Wood. As the names suggest, these made major encroachments into woodland.

The water-tower was built in 1929 to supply Cookridge village on one of the highest points in Leeds at 198m (650 feet) above sea level. Near the water-tower is Tinshill BT Tower (also known as Cookridge Tower), a prominent landmark.

Sport
Cookridge has three sports clubs: Cookridge Cricket Club, 
Cookridge Hall Golf Club, and the Leeds Modernians Sports Club  
which has football, rugby and cricket teams. Bannatyne Group acquired Cookridge Hall in 2019.

Cookridge Hospital

Cookridge Hospital opened in 1869 as a 'Hospital for the Convalescent Poor in Leeds'. It was built in a secluded area by clearing away part of Ireland Wood, with a new road, Hospital Lane from Otley Old Road. The main building and the lodge, designed by Norman Shaw in 1868, are Grade II listed buildings.  A further wing was added in 1893, the Edward Jackson Memorial Ward. In 1888 a second set of buildings were opened, the Ida Hospital, named in memory of Ida North, by her father John North. A further similar set of buildings were opened in 1905 named after the benefactor as Robert Arthington Hospital.

The buildings mainly functioned as longer-term convalescent facilities for patients treated in other Leeds hospitals, and were used for the care of wounded servicemen during both World Wars.  The whole complex was taken over by the Government in 1939 and part used as a maternity hospital until 1942.  In 1952 it became part of the NHS.  A 'High Energy Radiation Centre', providing treatment of tumours opened in 1956. From then on it developed into a major regional centre for radiotherapy, with the Ida and Robert Arthington Hospitals becoming home to the Yorkshire Regional Cancer Organization in 1994.

In 2007 it closed and all facilities were transferred to the St James's Oncology Unit (Bexley Wing) of Leeds Teaching Hospitals NHS Trust.
  
Much of the site was used for housing from 2010, with the listed building being retained for future development. The Robert Arthington Hospital was refurbished and opened in 2015 as the Lighthouse School for pupils with autistic spectrum conditions.

Religion
The Church of England parish church was formerly that of St John the Baptist Church, Adel until Holy Trinity, a brick building on Green Lane, was constructed in 1961. Cookridge Methodist Church is a brick building on the junction of Tinshill Road and Otley Old Road. Grace Community Church meets at Cookridge Village Hall.

Education
The main primary schools in Cookridge are Holy Trinity Church of England (Aided) Primary School and Cookridge Primary School

Notable people
 Nick Hodgson, former drummer of the Kaiser Chiefs, was born here.

Location grid

See also
Listed buildings in Leeds (Adel and Wharfedale Ward)

References

External links

  Cookridge was in this parish
 
 
 
 Cookridge Hall website

Places in Leeds